Pat Carroll (born 1946) is an Australian singer in the 1960s and early 1970s, she is probably best known for her television appearances and her collaboration with Olivia Newton-John.

Biography and career 
Carroll was born in Melbourne, Victoria began her entertainment career at age eight when she started taking singing and dancing lessons. Appearances on children's TV shows followed by the time she was eleven years old. She continued by appearing in musical comedy shows such as Carnival and Bye Bye Birdie.

This led to appearing on national Australian pop TV shows such as Bandstand and The Go!! Show when in her mid-teens. Her first 45 single "He's My Guy" was released when she was 18.
 
In the mid-1960s Carroll and her friend Olivia Newton-John formed a singing duo called Pat and Olivia. Having won a song contest in Melbourne, they travelled to the United Kingdom. They achieved some success there on TV and in the clubs.  After a period of performing there, Carroll's visa expired, forcing her to return to Australia where she married in 1970 ex-Strangers member, John Farrar.  Newton-John stayed on and launched her own international career.

Carroll released a number of singles with W&G Records and Interfusion during the 1960s and early 1970s most of which failed to chart. Her most successful single in Australia was her cover of Dana's 1970 Eurovision winner "All Kinds of Everything".  However Carroll's best known single is "To the Sun" on account of its featuring Cliff Richard on backing vocals.

At about 1970, Farrar quit the Strangers and with Carroll, returned to London. During 1970s and 1980s, she often sang backing vocals on Olivia Newton-John's albums with John producing and writing songs.

Currently living in Malibu, California (US) with husband John Farrar: her first son Sam Farrar (born 29 June 1978) is the bass player of American rock'n'roll band Phantom Planet. Her second son, Max Farrar, is the keyboardist/guitarist of the rock 'n' roll band Azura.

Discography

Extended plays

Singles

References

 Noel McGrath's Australian Encyclopedia of Rock & Pop – 1978
 An Australian Rock Discography – Chris Spencer – 1990 – Moonlight Publishing
 The Who's Who of Australian Rock – Chris Spencer  – Moonlight Publishing
 The Encyclopedia of Australian Rock and Pop – Ian McFarlane – Allen & Unwin, Sydney – 1999
 Olivia Newton-John bio

External links
https://archive.today/20100814103435/http://www.btinternet.com/~shadows_archive/shadows/John_Farrar/default.htm

1946 births
Living people
Singers from Melbourne
Carroll, Pat
20th-century Australian women singers